Matthew John Taylor (born 5 August 1999) is a Welsh first-class cricketer.

Taylor was born in Wrexham in August 1999. He was educated at Bedford Modern School where he was Captain of the first XI. While studying at Bedford, Taylor began playing minor counties cricket for Bedfordshire, making his debut at the age of 18 in the 2017 MCCA Knockout Trophy. Up to and including the 2019 season, Taylor has also played Minor Counties Championship and Minor Counties T20 matches for Bedfordshire County Cricket Club where he was Vice Captain.

From Bedford he went up to Oxford Brookes University and while studying there he coached the Ladies first XI and made two appearances in first-class cricket for Oxford MCCU against Middlesex and Hampshire in 2019. He scored 101 runs in his two matches, with a high score of 61 not out against Middlesex, which was the highest score by any of the 40 debutants in that round of matches.

References

External links

1999 births
Living people
Sportspeople from Wrexham
People educated at Bedford Modern School
Welsh cricketers
Bedfordshire cricketers
Alumni of Oxford Brookes University
Oxford MCCU cricketers